Ernesto Finance (15 January 1891–16 February 1974) was a Mexican stage and film actor.

Selected filmography
 Por mis pistolas (1938)
 The Whip (1939)
 Simón Bolívar (1942)
 Corner Stop (1948)
 Music, Poetry and Madness (1948)
 The Magician (1949)
 Philip of Jesus (1949)
 A Gringo Girl in Mexico (1951)
 The Atomic Fireman (1952)
 If I Were a Congressman (1952)
 A Tailored Gentleman (1954)
 Magdalena (1955)
 Drop the Curtain (1955)
 The Bandits of Cold River (1956)
 Comedians and Songs (1960)

References

Bibliography 
 Rogelio Agrasánchez. Guillermo Calles: A Biography of the Actor and Mexican Cinema Pioneer. McFarland, 2010.

External links 
 

1891 births
1974 deaths
Mexican male film actors